Éléonore Sioui  or Eléonore Sioui Tecumseh Tsikonsaseh (1920 – March 5, 2006) was a Wendat Canadian academic. Her parents were Caroline and Emery Sioui and were part of an important and well-known Wendat family. She was the first Canadian Indian woman to receive a PhD. In 2000, she was awarded the Order of Canada

In 2019, her work was part of a Saint-Venant de Paquette  reading.

Works 
 Andatha (Val-d'Or: Éditions Hyperborée, 1985; 
 Femme de l'île (Rillieux: Sur le dos de la tortue, numéro hors série, 1990); 
 Corps à coeur éperdu (Val-d'Or: D'ici et d'ailleurs, coll. "Cygnes du ciel", 1992

Further reading

References 

Canadian women academics
1925 births
2006 deaths
First Nations women
Université Laval alumni
University of Ottawa alumni